The women's 100 metres event at the 2003 Summer Universiade was held in Daegu, South Korea on 25–26 August.

Medalists

Results

Heats
Wind:Heat 1: +1.1 m/s, Heat 2: +1.4 m/s, Heat 3: -0.4 m/s, Heat 4: +2.3 m/s, Heat 5: +1.7 m/s

Quarterfinals
Wind:Heat 1: +0.3 m/s, Heat 2: -0.4 m/s, Heat 3: +0.3 m/s

Semifinals
Wind:Heat 1: -0.3 m/s, Heat 2: 0.0 m/s

Final
Wind: -0.7 m/s

References
Results

Athletics at the 2003 Summer Universiade
2003 in women's athletics
2003